Lucius Vinicius (fl. 1st century BC) was a Roman Senator who was appointed suffect consul in 33 BC.

Vinicius was a Novus homo whose family originated at Cales in Campania, and who were members of the Roman equestrian order. A supporter of Julius Caesar, he was elected tribune of the plebs for 51 BC, during which time he vetoed an anti-Caesarean resolution of the Senate.

His support for Caesar and then Augustus saw him appointed as suffect consul in 33 BC, replacing Marcus Acilius Glabrio, and serving from October through to the end of December. He was later appointed the Proconsular governor of Asia, probably serving from 27 BC through to 25 BC.

Vinicius had at least one son, Lucius Vinicius, who was appointed suffect consul in 5 BC.

References

Broughton, T. Robert S., The Magistrates of the Roman Republic, Vol. II (1952)
Syme, Ronald, The Augustan Aristocracy (1986). Clarendon Press.

1st-century BC Roman consuls
Roman governors of Asia
Senators of the Roman Republic
Tribunes of the plebs
Lucius (consul 721 AC)
Year of birth unknown
Year of death unknown